The 2017 Duke Blue Devils football team represented Duke University in the 2017 NCAA Division I FBS football season as a member of the Atlantic Coast Conference (ACC) in the Coastal Division. The team was led by head coach David Cutcliffe, in his tenth year, and played its home games at Wallace Wade Stadium in Durham, North Carolina. They finished the season 7–6 overall and 3–5 in ACC play to place in a three-way tie for fourth in the Coastal Division. They were invited to the Quick Lane Bowl, where they defeated Northern Illinois.

Schedule

Game summaries

North Carolina Central

Northwestern

Baylor

at North Carolina

Miami (FL)

at Virginia

Florida State

Pittsburgh

at Virginia Tech

at Army

Georgia Tech

at Wake Forest

vs. Northern Illinois–Quick Lane Bowl

References

Duke
Duke Blue Devils football seasons
Quick Lane Bowl champion seasons
Duke Blue Devils football